ACCD may refer to:

 accD, the beta subunit of the Acetyl-CoA carboxylase enzyme
 Austin Community College District
 American Coalition of Citizens with Disabilities
 Art Center College of Design